Nathaniel Forster may refer to:

Nathaniel Forster (scholar) (1718–1757), English classical and biblical scholar
Nathaniel Forster (writer), English writer on politics and the economy